Dom João I of Braganza (1543 – 22 February 1583) was the 6th Duke of Braganza and 1st Duke of Barcelos, among other titles. He is known for pushing the claims of his wife, Infanta Catherine of Guimarães, to the throne of Portugal.

Life
In 1563 he married his 1st cousin Infanta Catherine, daughter of Prince Edward, Duke of Guimarães and Isabel of Braganza (João's aunt).

After the disaster of the Battle of Ksar El Kebir, where heirless King Sebastian of Portugal died, the aged Cardinal Henry of Portugal had become King. Because Henry was old and was not allowed to have legitimate children, a dynastical crisis occurred even before the death of the Cardinal. The Duke of Braganza supported his wife's claim to the throne (she was a granddaughter of King Manuel I). Philip II of Spain (another grandson of Manuel I and also claimant to the throne), tried to bribe him to abandon his wife's pretensions, offering him the Vice-Kingdom of Brazil, the post of Grand-Master of the Order of Christ, a license to send a personal ship to India every year, and the marriage of his eldest son Teodósio of Braganza to one of his daughters (either Isabella Clara Eugenia or Catherine Michaela). The Duke of Braganza, influenced by his wife, refused the proposal.

Portuguese succession crisis 

When the Cardinal-King died, the Duke accompanied the governors of the Kingdom to Lisbon and Setúbal, trying to assure recognition for his wife's claim, but ultimately gave up and accepted the rule of Philip II (future Philip I of Portugal). After the civil war that followed, Anthony, Prior of Crato was defeated at the Battle of Alcântara, and Philip II entered Portugal and was confirmed by the Cortes of Tomar, where João occupied the post of Constable.

When King Philip left to Spain, he endowed the post of Constable of Kingdom to João's heir Teodósio, 7th Duke of Braganza, a marquessate (Flexilla-Xarandilla) to his second son, Dom Duarte, and a commandment and many concessions to the third, Dom Alexandre, who was destined to become an ecclesiastic. He confirmed João's title of His Excellency and his rights of chancellery.

He died at Vila Viçosa in 1583.

Marriage and issue 

Of Catherine, Duchess of Braganza:
 Maria of Braganza (January 27, 1565 – April 30, 1592)
 Serafina of Braganza (1566–1604), married to Juan Fernandez Pacheco, 5th Duke of Escalona
 Teodósio II, 7th Duke of Braganza (1568–1630), father of the future king João IV of Portugal, married Ana de Velasco y Giron, daughter of the Duque de Frias
 Duarte de Portugal (1569–1627), 1st Marquis of Frechilla (i.e. Flexilla)
 Alexandre of Braganza, Archbishop of Évora
 Querubina of Braganza (1572–1580)
 Angélica of Braganza (1573–1576)
 Isabella of Braganza (1578–1582)
 Filipe of Braganza (1581–1608)

Ancestry

Bibliography 
 "Nobreza de Portugal e Brasil", Vol. II pages 445 to 448. Published by Zairol Lda., Lisbon 1989

External links 

 Genealogy of João I, 6th Duke of Braganza (in Portuguese)

|-

Portuguese royalty
House of Braganza
1543 births
1583 deaths
Dukes of Braganza
101
16th-century Portuguese people
Constables of Portugal
Portuguese nobility